Sober curious is a cultural movement and lifestyle of practising none or limited alcohol consumption that started spreading in the late 2010's, in particular among people from the millennials generation, and was coined by Ruby Warrington in her 2019 book Sober Curious. It differs from traditional abstinence in that it is not founded on asceticism, religious condemnation of alcohol or previous alcohol abuse, but motivated by a curiosity of a sober lifestyle. Markets have reacted by offering a wider selection of non-alcoholic beverages.

Definition and characteristics

Sober curiosity is often defined as having the option to question or change one’s drinking habits, for mental or physical health reasons. It may be practised in many ways, ranging from complete abstinence to thinking more about when and how much one actually wants to drink.

The fear of being different, and being rejected by one’s friends is one of the reasons why people drink. If you say no to alcohol, you risk being sober shamed, i.e. labeled as boring, antisocial or restrained, or people may think you are either pregnant, religious or an ex-alcoholic. Moreover, alcohol is a symbol of weekend, freedom and celebration, and the belief is widespread that alcohol is the only way to loosen up. But if one only feels alive and happy when drinking a certain liquid, and one’s life is centered about when it is the weekend, and one can drink again, that life tends to become paltry and artificial.

According to Ida Fabricius Bruun, CEO of the Danish ngo Alkohol & Samfund, parents play an important role in showing their children that socializing is quite possible without drinking alcohol.

By region

In comparison to their parents, part of the American Millennials seem more concerned with maintaining their health, e.g. through physical activity and limited alcohol intake, yet believe that a healthier relationship with alcohol doesn’t require them to give up drinking entirely. Moreover, cannabis seems to some degree to replace alcohol: A 2017 study found that in US counties with legalized medicinal cannabis, alcohol sales dropped more than 12 percent when compared with similar counties without cannabis.

Almost 20% of Danes drink more alcohol than the limit recommended by the Danish Health Authority, while year after year, Danish teenagers hold the European record of alcohol intake. Every summer, when first year students start college, Danish media bring stories of how the introductory social activities challenge students, who do not like to be drunk. However, between 2010 and 2023, the sale of non-alcoholic beer in Denmark was six-doubled, while lately the sale of non-alcoholic wine and spirits has also risen. By early 2023, non-alcoholic beverages have a Danish market share of about 4%.

In Japanese business life, drinking alcohol with colleagues after work is considered quite normal, and difficult to refuse, giving non-drinking colleagues a disadvantage, in particular about promotions. Japanese sober curious were therefore greatly encouraged, when in 2020 non-drinking Yoshihide Suga was appointed prime minister.

See also
 Neo-prohibitionism
 Teetotalism
 Temperance bar

Literature
Ruby Warrington (2019): Sober Curious - The Blissful Sleep, Greater Focus, Limitless Presence, and Deep Connection Awaiting Us All on the Other Side of Alcohol, Harpercollins Publishers Inc, 240 pages, ISBN 9780062869036

References

External links
 The Dry January Story, on alcoholchange.org.uk

Lifestyle